Deh Kheyr-e Pain (also Romanized as Deh Kheyr-e Pā’īn and Deh Khair Pain; also known as Deh Kheyr-e Soflá and Kheir Sofla) is a village in Qaryah ol Kheyr Rural District, in the Central District of Darab County, Fars Province, Iran. At the 2006 census, its population was 1,987, in 459 families.

References 

Populated places in Darab County